The United States District Court for the Southern District of Indiana (in case citations, S.D. Ind.) is a federal district court in Indiana. It was created in 1928 by an act of Congress that split Indiana into two separate districts, northern and southern.  The Southern District is divided into four divisions, Indianapolis, Terre Haute, Evansville, and New Albany. Appeals from the Southern District of Indiana are taken to the United States Court of Appeals for the Seventh Circuit (except for patent claims and claims against the U.S. government under the Tucker Act, which are appealed to the Federal Circuit).  The court has five judges, four full-time United States magistrate judges and two part-time magistrate judges.

The courtrooms are located in the Birch Bayh Federal Building in Indianapolis.

History 
Of all district courts to be subdivided, Indiana existed for the longest time as a single court, 111 years.

Divisions of the Southern District 

Indianapolis: Bartholomew County, Boone County, Brown County, Clinton County, Decatur County, Delaware County, Fayette County, Fountain County, Franklin County, Hamilton County, Hancock County, Hendricks County, Henry County, Howard County, Johnson County, Madison County, Marion County, Monroe County, Montgomery County, Morgan County, Randolph County, Rush County, Shelby County, Tipton County, Union County and Wayne County.

Terre Haute: Clay County, Greene County, Knox County, Owen County, Parke County, Putnam County, Sullivan County, Vermillion County and Vigo County.

Evansville: Daviess County, 
Dubois County, Gibson County, Martin County, Perry County, Pike County, Posey County, Spencer County, Vanderburgh County and Warrick County.

New Albany: Clark County, Crawford County, Dearborn County, Floyd County, Harrison County, Jackson County, Jefferson County, Jennings County, Lawrence County, Ohio County, Orange County, Ripley County, Scott County, Switzerland County and Washington County.

Current judges 
:

Vacancies and pending nominations

Former judges

Chief judges

Succession of seats

List of U.S. Attorneys since 1929

See also 
 Courts of Indiana
 List of current United States district judges
 List of United States federal courthouses in Indiana

References

External links 
 United States District Court, Southern District of Indiana
 United States Attorney, Southern District of Indiana

Indiana, Southern District
Indiana law
Terre Haute, Indiana
Evansville, Indiana
New Albany, Indiana
Indianapolis
1928 establishments in Indiana
Courthouses in Indiana
Courts and tribunals established in 1928